William Curran may refer to:

 William Curran (umpire) (died 1921), cricket Test match umpire.
 William Curran (politician) (1885–1951), Attorney General of Maryland
 William Curran (American football) (born 1959), American football wide receiver
 William Hughes Curran (1893–1940), American film director
 Billy Curran, New Zealand rugby league player